The 1941 Montana Grizzlies football team was an American football team that represented the University of Montana as a member of the Pacific Coast Conference (PCC) during the 1941 college football season. In their seventh year under head coach Doug Fessenden, the Grizzlies compiled a 6–3 record (1–3 against PCC opponents) and outscored opponents by a total of 119 to 94. The team played its home games at Dornblaser Field in Missoula, Montana.

Schedule

References

External links
 Montana Grizzlies football – 1941 media guide

Montana
Montana Grizzlies football seasons
Montana Grizzlies football